Bierzwnik  is a village in Choszczno County, West Pomeranian Voivodeship, in north-western Poland. It is the seat of the gmina (administrative district) called Gmina Bierzwnik.

References

Bierzwnik